Alexander I may refer to:

 Alexander I of Macedon, king of Macedon from 495–454 BC
 Alexander I of Epirus (370–331 BC), king of Epirus
 Pope Alexander I (died 115), early bishop of Rome
 Pope Alexander I of Alexandria (died 320s), patriarch of Alexandria
 Alexander I of Scotland ( – 1124), king of Scotland
 Aleksandr Mikhailovich of Tver (1301–1339), prince of Tver as Alexander I
 Alexander I of Georgia (1386–?), king of Georgia
 Alexander I of Moldavia (died 1432), prince of Moldavia
 Alexander I of Kakheti (1445–1511), king of Kakheti
 Alexander Jagiellon (1461–1506), king of Poland
 Alexander I of Russia (1777–1825), emperor of Russia
 Alexander of Battenberg (1857–1893), prince of Bulgaria
 Alexander I of Serbia (1876–1903), king of Serbia
 Alexander I of Yugoslavia (1888–1934), king of Yugoslavia
 Alexander of Greece (1893–1920), king of Greece

See also
 King Alexander (disambiguation)